Singer Jim McKee is a 1924 American silent Western film directed by Clifford Smith and written by William S. Hart and J.G. Hawks. Starring William S. Hart, Phyllis Haver, J. Gordon Russell, Bert Sprotte, Patsy Ruth Miller, and Edward Coxen, it was released on March 3, 1924, by Paramount Pictures.

Plot
As described in a film magazine review, disguised as Spanish bandits, miners Singer McKee and Buck  Holden hold up a stage coach. Buck is killed in an encounter with the sheriff's men. Jim escapes with Buck's baby, Mary, and rears her to womanhood. Because Mary needs clothes, Jim robs a motor bus. He is caught, but meanwhile he saves Mary from assault by a drunken suitor. Jim serves his sentence. At its expiration, he finds happiness with Mary.

Cast

Preservation
Copies of Singer Jim McKee are held in the collections of the Library of Congress, Museum of Modern Art, UCLA Film and Television Archive, and Gosfilmofond in Moscow. The film does not appear to have been released on DVD.

References

External links

Lobby card at silenthollywood.com

1924 films
1924 Western (genre) films
Paramount Pictures films
American black-and-white films
Silent American Western (genre) films
Films directed by Clifford Smith
1920s English-language films
1920s American films